Sirsalis is a relatively young lunar impact crater located near the western lunar limb, to the southwest of the Oceanus Procellarum. The crater lies across a ridge that runs in a north–south direction. It has a sharp edge and a low central peak. The crater overlaps the slightly larger and older Sirsalis A to the west-southwest, and the two form a distinctive feature.

To the east is a rille system named the Rimae Sirsalis. The longest of these rilles follows a line running approximately north-northeast to south-southwest, just clearing the southeastern rim of Sirsalis by about 10 kilometers. This long rille runs 330 kilometers from the shore of Oceanus Procellarum until it crosses the crater Darwin A and intersects the Rimae Darwin to the east of Darwin.

Satellite craters
By convention these features are identified on lunar maps by placing the letter on the side of the crater midpoint that is closest to Sirsalis.

References

 
 
 
 
 
 
 
 
 
 
 
 

Impact craters on the Moon